How to Cheat in the Leaving Certificate is a 1997 independent Irish film directed by Graham Jones, in which six teenagers devise a plan to cheat in their Leaving Certificate final school examinations. The film was shot in black and white on Super 16mm and was later blown up to 35mm for theatrical distribution. Many well known Irish faces made cameo appearances in the film.

Plot
Upon being caught cheating in his Leaving Certificate exam and being banned from sitting the exam for another three years, a young man commits suicide. A close friend of his subsequently plots to cheat in his own Leaving Certificate in order to get revenge against the system. With the help of a rag-tag group of friends this young man organizes a complex scheme to steal copies of the test papers from the Department of Education and, upon winning, show the world he has beaten the system.

Cast 
 Eamon Morrissey as Mr. Fornson
 Aileen O'Connor as Cara
 Garret Baker as Fionn
 Lee Dunne as Brian Donnelly
 Joe McKinney as Niall
 Mary McEvoy as Charlie McDaid
 Philip Bredin as Murphy
 Alison Coffey as Elli
 Chris de Burgh as petrol pumper (cameo)

Production
The Irish Film Board helped fund the film, contributing £90,000 to its production. The film was shot in a six-week period.

Critical reception
Writing for Variety, critic Emanuel Levy praised the film's "droll humor that is occasionally laced with irony", as well as Jones's "technical panache." He added, "Once the premise has been set and central characters established, the film becomes less funny and more suspenseful regarding the final outcome of the scandalous act. Compensating for the plot’s narrow focus are the helmer’s bold visual style and the intermittently witty voiceover narration." An Phoblacht called the film "an irreverent and rebellious diatribe against the Irish education system."

Controversy
A few weeks before the film went on general release in Ireland, the Junior Minister for Education, Willie O'Dea, condemned the film, leading to widespread coverage in newspapers, television, and radio. Anxiety was partly due to the timing of the film's release, which occurred a few months before the annual summer exams. Other projects by Graham Jones, such as Fudge 44, have also caused controversy.

Music
"I Hear You Breathing In", from Eleanor McEvoy's debut album, Eleanor McEvoy, and "Parachute" by Something Happens are some of the tracks featured in the film.

References

External links

Critic reviews at tadhg.com
The film itself via Graham Jones' official website

1997 films
1997 independent films
Irish teen comedy films
Irish black-and-white films
Irish independent films
English-language Irish films
1990s teen comedy films
Films set in 1996
Films set in 1997
Films set in 2000
1997 comedy films
Films shot in 16 mm film
1990s English-language films